Michael Joseph Monaghan (28 June 1963 – 15 January 2020) was a Scottish  footballer, who played for Queen's Park, Hamilton Academical, Dumbarton, Stirling Albion and Alloa Athletic.

References

1963 births
Scottish footballers
Dumbarton F.C. players
Queen's Park F.C. players
Stirling Albion F.C. players
Hamilton Academical F.C. players
Alloa Athletic F.C. players
Scottish Football League players
Living people
Association football goalkeepers
Footballers from Glasgow